Eucalyptra is a monotypic moth genus of the family Heliodinidae. Its only species, Eucalyptra picractis, is known from Java. Both the genus and the species were first described by Edward Meyrick in 1921.

References

Heliodinidae
Monotypic moth genera